You Don't Look 40, Charlie Brown, the first Peanuts television special of the 1990s, is one of many prime-time animated TV specials, based on characters from the Charles M. Schulz comic strip Peanuts. It originally aired on the CBS network on February 2, 1990, An International Groundhog Day Tradition. 

Hosted by Knots Landing star Michele Lee, this special includes a reunion of the many actors and actresses who voiced the Peanuts characters from 1963 to 1989. Also included are a special guest appearance of Lee herself.

The special also has three music videos to promote the album Happy Anniversary, Charlie Brown including "Little Birdie" by Joe Williams, "Linus and Lucy" by David Benoit and "Joe Cool" by B.B. King.

The special was released on VHS through Paramount Home Video.

Actors and actresses interviewed
 Brad Kesten (Charlie Brown, 1983–1985)
 Chad Allen (Charlie Brown, 1986)
 Stuart Brotman (Peppermint Patty, 1975–1977)
 Erin Chase (first girl to voice Charlie Brown, 1988–1989)
 Sally Dryer (Lucy van Pelt, 1966–1968)
 Robin Kohn (Lucy van Pelt, 1972–1973)
 Jeremy Miller (Linus van Pelt, 1985–1988)
 Geoffrey Ornstein (Pigpen, 1965)
 Peter Robbins (original Charlie Brown, 1963–1969)
 Heather Stoneman (Lucy van Pelt, 1984–1986)
 Bill Melendez (Snoopy & Woodstock)

References

External links

Peanuts television documentaries
1990 television films
1990 films
1990 documentary films
1990 television specials
1990 in American television
1990s American animated films
1990s American television specials
1990s animated television specials
Documentary specials